The Playhouse  Theatre was a Broadway theater at 137 West 48th Street in midtown Manhattan, New York City. Charles A. Rich was the architect.  It was built in 1911 for producer William A. Brady who also owned the nearby 48th Street Theatre. After Brady died in 1944, it was sold to the Shubert Organization. From 1949 to 1952, it was an ABC Radio studio.

Sauce for the Goose was the opening production on April 15, 1911, closing after 2 performances that day.

The Playhouse Theatre was also used for interiors and exteriors in the Mel Brooks film, The Producers (1967) for staging their musical, Springtime for Hitler.

In 1969, the Playhouse Theatre was razed to accommodate the Rockefeller Center expansion and the construction of 1221 Avenue of the Americas.

Notable productions
 The Family Cupboard (1913)
 Major Barbara (1915)
 The Man Who Came Back (1916) 
 The Little Teacher (1918)
 Forever After (1918)
 The Wonderful Thing (1920) 
 Romance (1921) 
 On the Stairs (1922) 
 Up She Goes (1922)
 Chains (1923)
 The Show Off (1924) 
 Twelve Miles Out (1925)
 Kitty's Kisses (1926) 
 The Road to Rome (1927) and revival (1928)
 The Queen's Husband (1928) 
 Street Scene (1929) 
 The First Mrs. Fraser (1929) 
 The Vinegar Tree (1930) 
 A Church Mouse (1931) 
 Mademoiselle (1932) 
 Three Men on a Horse (1935)
 Yes, My Darling Daughter (1937)
 Outward Bound (1938)
 Spring Again (1942)
 The Damask Cheek (1942)
 The Duke in Darkness (1944)
 The Glass Menagerie (1945)
 Edith Piaf (1947) 
 The Innocents (1950) 
 Bernardine (1952)  
 Fallen Angels (1956) 
 Night of the Auk (1956) 
 Blue Denim (1958) 
 Make a Million (1958) 
 The Miracle Worker (1959) 
 Never Too Late (1962) 
 The Impossible Years (1965)

References

External links
performingartsarchive Playhouse Theatre 
Museum of the City of New York - Playhouse Theatre

Playhouse Theatre
Theatres completed in 1911
Former theatres in Manhattan
Demolished theatres in New York City
Demolished buildings and structures in Manhattan
1911 establishments in New York City
1969 disestablishments in New York (state)
Buildings and structures demolished in 1969